Areneo David is a Malawian competitive archer. At the 2016 Summer Olympics in Rio de Janeiro, David etched a historic mark for Malawi as the first ever archer to compete in an Olympic tournament, shooting only in the men's individual recurve through a tripartite invitation. For the 72-arrow qualifying round, David discharged 603 points out of a possible 720 to take the sixty-second spot from a field of 64 archers, before he faced his initial challenge against the third-seeded Italian archer David Pasqualucci, which led to his abrupt departure from the tournament at 0–6.

At the 2020 Summer Olympics, he competed in the men's individual event.

References

External links
 

Malawian male archers
Living people
People from Lilongwe
1995 births
Archers at the 2016 Summer Olympics
Olympic archers of Malawi
Competitors at the 2019 African Games
African Games competitors for Malawi
Archers at the 2020 Summer Olympics
20th-century Malawian people
21st-century Malawian people